Helen Delich Bentley (November 28, 1923 – August 6, 2016) was an American politician who was a Republican member of the United States House of Representatives from Maryland from 1985 to 1995. Before entering politics, she had been a leading maritime reporter and journalist.

Early life 
Bentley was born in the copper-mining town of Ruth, Nevada. Her parents were immigrant Serbians, and her father was a miner. When Bentley was eight years old, her father died of silicosis, a common miner's disease, and Bentley took a part-time job in a dress shop while her mother took in boarders to support the family.

While at high school, she had her first experiences of journalism and politics while working on the weekly newspaper of Ely, Nevada, which was published by Republican state legislator Charles Russell. She won scholarships to study journalism at the University of Missouri, graduating in 1944 after earning a BA degree with honors. While at college, she worked on the Senate campaign for Democrat James D. Scrugham, and was appointed his Senate secretary.

Career

Journalism 
Following her graduation, Bentley worked for small-town newspapers in Fort Wayne, Indiana, and Lewiston, Idaho, but she wanted to report hard news for a larger publication; at the time, most women journalists were limited to writing society news. She wrote to all the main East Coast newspapers and eventually, in 1945, The Baltimore Sun offered her a reporting position. She initially reported on labor and union matters, but was subsequently allocated maritime and waterfront news. She became a widely respected maritime reporter, dealing with people from dock workers to state politicians, and also writing for port agencies and shipping companies.

Beginning in 1950 Bentley hosted a local Baltimore TV program on WMAR, The Port That Built a City, presenting maritime and transportation-related news. Later retitled The Port That Built a City and State, the series was produced by Bentley until 1965 and included then-novel live remotes from the decks of ships in Baltimore harbor during the early years of television.

During the Vietnam War, Bentley became aware of the congestion in the port of Saigon, and traveled there to report on the problems of supplying American troops. President Johnson became aware of her report, and subsequently improvements were made to port facilities in Cam Ranh Bay to relieve pressure on Saigon.

Politics 
In 1969, Bentley was offered a seat on the Federal Maritime Commission. However, she declined and asked for the position of chair instead. She was appointed and chaired the commission from 1969 to 1975. The position made her the highest-ranking woman in President Nixon's administration. During her tenure, Bentley advocated for federal support for American shipbuilding yards.

She defeated Long on her third attempt in 1984, and was elected to the 99th Congress and to the four succeeding Congresses, serving from January 3, 1985, to January 3, 1995.

During her time in office, Bentley was a strong advocate for protectionist trade policies in support of U.S. manufacturing and the U.S. Merchant Marine fleet. She also introduced legislation which enabled Chesapeake Bay to be dredged, allowing larger cargo ships to access the port of Baltimore. In the 1990s, she was sympathetic towards Serbians during the civil war in Yugoslavia, and opposed U.S. military involvement in that conflict.

Bentley was not a candidate for reelection to the 104th Congress in 1994, but was an unsuccessful candidate for nomination for Governor of Maryland. Despite an endorsement from the incumbent Democratic governor William Donald Schaefer, she was defeated in the Republican primary by the more conservative Ellen Sauerbrey.

When her successor in Congress, Bob Ehrlich, gave up his seat, Bentley sought to take the seat back in 2002.  However, the district had been made significantly more Democratic in redistricting and included a large slice of Baltimore City, an area Bentley had never represented.  She lost to Baltimore County Executive Dutch Ruppersberger.

In 1995, Bentley founded Helen Bentley & Associates, Inc., and provided consultancy services on international trade, business and government. She was also a consultant for the Maryland Port Administration and the Port of Baltimore, and served on the Board of Trustees for both the Baltimore Museum of Industry and the Maritime Industries Academy High School.

Electoral record

Recognition 
In 2004, Bentley was inducted into the International Maritime Hall of Fame. In 2006, as part of the port of Baltimore's 300th anniversary celebrations, the port was renamed the Helen Delich Bentley Port of Baltimore.

Bentley was also a member of the Maryland Women's Hall of Fame, and a recipient of the Speaker's Medallion, First Citizen Award and Governor's International Leadership Award from the state government of Maryland.

Personal life 
Bentley was married to William Roy Bentley, who died in 2003 from a stroke. The couple had no children. She died at the age of 92, at her home in Timonium, Maryland, from brain cancer.

See also 
 Women in the United States House of Representatives

References

External links 

A Few Good Women... The Honorable Helen Delich Bentley 

 

1923 births
2016 deaths
The Baltimore Sun people
People from White Pine County, Nevada
American people of Serbian descent
University of Missouri alumni
Female members of the United States House of Representatives
Women in Maryland politics
Federal Maritime Commission members
Republican Party members of the United States House of Representatives from Maryland
20th-century American politicians
21st-century American politicians
Journalists from Maryland
Candidates in the 2002 United States elections
Deaths from brain cancer in the United States
20th-century American women politicians
21st-century American women politicians
Eastern Orthodox Christians from the United States
Members of Congress who became lobbyists